Hyperion is the second studio album by French DJ Gesaffelstein, released on 8 March 2019. The album includes the singles "Reset", "Lost in the Fire" with the Weeknd, and "Blast Off" with Pharrell Williams.

Background
Gesaffelstein signed to Columbia Records in October 2018, and the following month, it was announced in a short press release that he would release new music "soon".

Promotion
Gesaffelstein promoted the album with "mysterious" billboards and social media posts throughout November, with the album's cover art and title being shared on a billboard in Miami in December 2018. The website Dancing Astronaut stated that it was not clear from the billboard whether the entire billboard itself or the included picture of a "shattering black pane" was the cover art. The album's release was preceded by the release of three singles, "Reset", "Lost in the Fire", and "Blast Off". The first being released on 29 November 2018, the second being released on 11 January 2019, and the third being released on 1 March 2019.

Critical reception

Upon release, Hyperion received mixed reviews. In a positive review, Kat Bein from Billboard stated Hyperion as being good, complimenting the album cohesion and experimental tracklist. 

The album's mixed reviews criticized the lack of definition in the artist's style and sound. Pitchforks Larry Fitzmaurice called Lévy's production a "budget-level attempt to replicate ... other artists", ultimately calling Lévy an artist who has not defined himself, and stating, "that while he has consistency on his side, true artistic evolution remains out of Lévy's reach." NMEs Luke Morgan Britton dismissed the LP as "uninspired and lacking in substance", mainly due to the record's lack of grip on a mood or sound. Even a supporter, Release Magazine journalist Peter Marchione, found the record's four "direct" vocal songs out of place with the "mature" instrumentals.

Critics were also generally less positive towards the tracks with featured artists. Britton argued they contributed to the "directionless feeling" and "largely see Lévy failing to truly engage with what his guests can bring to the table", made worse by the producer's own character being nonexistent. Marchione considered the instrumentals "well produced and at times more refined" than the vocal songs.

Track listing
Track listing adapted from Pitchfork.

Notes
  signifies a miscellaneous production credit

Charts

References

2019 albums
Columbia Records albums
Gesaffelstein albums